Card throwing is the art of throwing standard playing cards with great accuracy or force.  It is performed both as part of stage magic shows and as a competitive physical feat among magicians, with official records existing for longest distance thrown, fastest speed, highest throw, greatest accuracy, and the greatest number of cards in one minute.

History 

First popularized in the West among stage magicians during the 1800s, the art of throwing cards is called scaling.  Techniques used among performers today are attributed to stage magicians in the late 19th century. The exact origins of "flying card" tricks are unknown, but Alexander Herrmann is widely attributed with first including card throwing in a major act.  He would use custom-made cards, sign them, and then throw them into the audience as potential souvenirs. The magician Howard Thurston also used card throwing as a major part of his act.  The cards that they used, however, were heavier than those commonly used today.

Many magicians commissioned specially printed cards, known as throwing cards, throwouts, scaling cards, or souvenir cards to use for these purposes.  Generally, such cards featured the image and name of the magician and often featured optical illusions, mystical images, and text and graphics from other advertisers. Propelled Pasteboards, a blog dedicated to the history of throwing cards and related ephemera, contains examples of hundreds of specially printed throwing cards used by magicians and other performers to advertise their performances.

Today, magicians all over the world use card throwing as parts of their act. Ricky Jay, Rick Smith Jr. and Aditya Kodmur are among the most well-known people to frequently use card throwing during performance.

Techniques
Playing cards and similar paper objects have very little mass and are not very aerodynamic except under certain circumstances. Simply throwing a card with no technique (that is, applying lateral speed only) usually will result in it fluttering about and falling to the ground. Achieving accuracy, distance, and force with a card requires giving it both lateral speed and angular momentum (i.e. "spin") along its z-axis. The spin creates gyroscopic stabilization so that the card's flat profile remains mostly parallel to the direction of travel and thus suffers the least possible air resistance.

There are multiple techniques for throwing cards in this manner. The technique often attributed to Alexander Herrmann, and taught in Ricky Jay's book Cards as Weapons (1977), involves gripping the middle of the card horizontally between the thumb and the middle finger, while the index finger rests on the corner of the card nearest the hand and away from the body. The wrist is cocked inward at a 90-degree angle, then flicked briskly outward, propelling the card. For distance and power, the technique adds motion of the forearm bending at the elbow straight outwards from a 90-degree angle simultaneous to the flicking motion of the wrist.

In another method created by Howard Thurston, the card is gripped between the first and second fingers, usually of the left hand, and propelled in a similar manner. There are also variations on both grips and throwing styles, some of which depend on the type of flight the magician is attempting to achieve.

Forceful throws will usually spiral somewhat on the way to the target when thrown at a long distance since most cards are not perfectly flat. With a given deck, the bend of the cards are usually similar enough to each other that this spiral is easily predictable, and a practiced magician can hit very small targets even at many yards away. It is also possible to throw a card very flat at lower speeds to get the card to land in or on top of something.

Many tricks done with thrown cards are designed to not only impress with the magician's dexterity but work on a common theme in stage magic: the illusion of danger. While the illusion of danger can be achieved by outright deception, another method is to play on people's popular misconceptions. In the case of card throwing, the magician achieves this effect by throwing the card at fragile targets such as newspaper, cigarettes, fruit, hot dogs, foam, or any other substance that the card will easily imbed in or break. While none of these objects act like human tissue in terms of wound ballistics, the magician is counting on most audience members thinking they actually are comparable, and therefore believing he or she has turned a harmless playing card into a deadly projectile.

Records
The current world record for farthest playing card thrown is held by Rick Smith Jr. who threw a card 65.96 meters (216 feet, 4 inches) on 2 December 2002. This is also the current record for the fastest throw, at 148 kilometers per hour (91.96 mph). Previous world record holders are Ricky Jay and Jim Karol.

The current record for the highest throw is held by Rick Smith Jr., who, on 14 March 2015, threw a single playing card to a height of 21.41 meters (70 feet, 3 inches) at the Great Lake Science Center in Cleveland, Ohio.

The world record for most accurate playing card throwing is held by Aditya Kodmur, who consecutively threw 117 cards into a target without missing on 11 December 2021.

On 13 August 2018, Rokas Bernatonis broke the Guinness World Record for the "most one fingered playing card scales in one minute". To break the record, Rokas had to hold a deck of playing cards in one hand and use his thumb to propel ("scale") the cards from the deck a minimum distance of 12 feet. Rokas was able to scale 122 playing cards in one minute, beating the previous record of 114 playing cards set by magician Chris Linn. The record took place in Vilnius, Lithuania

Urban legend about use as a weapon
The impressive speed that magicians could throw the cards gave rise to a myth that a card could kill or seriously injure someone if thrown correctly by a person with enough force.  The book Cards as Weapons by Ricky Jay is believed to have propagated this myth even though it was originally intended to combine instruction with satire.

This myth was tested on the Discovery Channel program MythBusters, and subsequently debunked. Mythbusters co-host Adam Savage was already familiar with the throwing card trick and was shown to be adept at performing it, with his maximum throwing speed being measured at 25 miles per hour or 40 km/h. The episode also featured Ricky Jay himself, who spoke of writing the book and admitted he is most likely responsible for the genesis of the myth. The hosts were able to measure the speed of his throws at about 90 mph. After failing to throw the cards into a ballistic gelatin target with enough force that would result in injury, they used an electric motor to mechanically launch a card at 150 mph.  Offering his own body as a target, host Jamie Hyneman allowed the launcher to be fired at the exposed skin of his abdomen from a few feet away, which only resulted in a superficial paper cut.  The hosts concluded that a playing card lacks enough mass to transfer sufficient energy to human tissue on impact.

In popular culture
 In the video game Payday 2, the player can select throwing cards as their throwable weapon.
 Batman's nemesis The Joker is known to employ weaponized playing cards, particularly in the 1992 animated TV series. These cards are usually not standard, however, often shown to be made of razor-sharpened steel and sometimes coated with deadly poison to increase lethality.
 Gambit (X-Men) is skilled in the art of card-throwing with great accuracy, which he combines with his mutant ability to "charge" objects with energy to turn the thrown cards into effective explosive weapons, like grenades.
 Hisoka, a regular antagonist in the manga and anime series Hunter x Hunter, often throws razor-sharp playing cards in battle.
Yuri of the Dirty Pair sometimes employs the "Bloody Card" – a technologically enhanced card – to attack multiple targets.
 City Hunter (1993) – features a gambling card thrower.
 Setzer, the gambling hero of Final Fantasy VI, uses a variety of card decks for weapons as well as darts and dice.
 3 Ninjas: High Noon at Mega Mountain (1998) – uses a specially designed throwing card, which appears to be bent, a possible enhancement.
Oswald (KOF XI) – practices the card-throwing art called Karnöffel.
Twisted Fate (League of Legends) – utilizes card throwing for all of his attacks.
 Hellsing, the Japanese horror manga, features a card-slinging sorcerer known as The Dandy Man.
 Sheena Fujibayashi (Tales of Symphonia) swings and strikes with tarot cards for all of her abilities and employs techniques where she empowers those cards with energy called "seals".
Sneff, a playable character in Chrono Cross, is a magician who uses a deck of cards as his primary weapon.
 Seto Kaiba has been known to do this in the original Yu-Gi-Oh! manga.
 Bullseye, from Marvel Comics, kills or injures several people (including Elektra) with a thrown Ace of Spades.
 Card throwing was one of the murder techniques used in the CSI episode "Last Woman Standing".
 In Now You See Me (2013), one of the magicians, Jack Wilder, proves to be a skilled card thrower. During a show, using a playing card, he cuts in half a pencil held by an audience member and later uses the technique to distract the FBI agent pursuing him. Also, in the movies' sequel, Now You See Me 2 (2016), The Four Horsemen, a group of magicians, steal a chip attached to a playing card in front of guards by throwing the card to each other while the guards aren't looking. 
 In Smokin' Aces, stage magician Buddy "Aces" Israel manages to temporarily incapacitate his bodyguard Ivy by striking him in the eye with a thrown playing card.
 In Jonathan Creek there is an episode where Jonathan uses his skills gained by reading the aforementioned book by Ricky Jay to incapacitate a potential shooter long enough for him to be apprehended by police
 In Kingdom Hearts, Luxord from Organization XIII wields playing cards in combat with "Fair Game" being his most used deck. Most of his other decks are themed after a Tarot deck's Major Arcana.
 In the anime Akikan! Yurika Kochikaze often throws cards at those who annoy her.

See also
 Card manipulation
 Cards in the hat

References

Further reading
 
 
 

Card tricks